A V8 is an engine with eight cylinders mounted on the crankcase in two banks of four cylinders.

V8 may also refer to:

Computers
 V8 (JavaScript engine), an open-source JavaScript engine
 V.8, an ITU-T recommendation for data communication over the telephone network
 V8 Unix, the eighth edition of Research Unix from 1985

Vehicles
 Aston Martin V8, 1969 two-door coupe-type automobile manufactured in the United Kingdom
 Audi V8, a 1988 large luxury saloon/sedan
 Fokker V.8, a German quintuplane
 V8 Supercars, an Australian touring car racing category

Other
 V8 (Argentine band) a heavy metal band
 V8 (beverage), a vegetable juice made by Campbell Soup Company
 V8 Marlborough Street, a grid road in the new town of Milton Keynes, England
 Vigilante 8, a vehicular combat game produced by Luxoflux
 Video8, a generation of 8mm video format
 V8 (TV channel), a defunct Dutch television channel

See also
 ATC code V08 Contrast media, a subgroup of the Anatomical Therapeutic Chemical Classification System
 V8 engine (disambiguation)